

The Supreme Patriarch of Thailand or Sangharaja is the head of the order of Buddhist monks in Thailand. His full title is Somdet Phra Saṅgharāja Sakalamahāsaṅghapariṇāyaka ('the Supreme Patriarch, the Head of all Members of the Sangha').

Ancient history 
As early as the Sukhothai period (thirteenth to sixteenth centuries CE), there were city-dwelling and forest-dwelling orders, and there was more than one Supreme Patriarch appointed. In modern times, however, only one position is responsible for all fraternities and orders. From 1992 to 2016, the Supreme Patriarch was chosen from the most senior member of the Supreme Sangha Council and officially endorsed by the King.  the Supreme Patriarch was formally appointed by the King of Thailand and co-signed by the Prime Minister, with consultation of the Sangha Supreme Council, an administrative body of the Thai Sangha. The Supreme Patriarch has legal authority to oversee both of Thailand's Theravada fraternities, the Maha Nikaya and the Dhammayuttika Nikaya, as well as the small minority of Mahayana Buddhists in the country. He is also the President of the Sangha Supreme Council.

Developments since the 2000s 

There has been recent discussion about reforming the Thai Sangha's leadership structure, including a 2002 proposal which would have moved many of the Sangha Council's and the Supreme Patriarch's powers to a new executive council. However, in 2015, it seemed the junta was not pushing for new Sangha legislation after all, after the proposals led to many organized protests and heated debate.

The former Supreme Patriarch was Somdet Phra Nyanasamvara Suvaddhana, who had served in this position since 1989. After suffering from increasingly serious health problems, died on 24 October 2013, aged a hundred years. In 2003, because of questions about the Supreme Patriarch's ability to fulfill his duties, the government of Thailand had appointed a special committee to act in his stead. In early 2004, Somdet Kiaw Upaseṇo was appointed acting Supreme Patriarch, an office that he held until his death in 2013.

After the death of Somdet Kiaw, Somdet Chuang Varapuñño of Wat Paknam Bhasicharoen became the next acting Supreme Patriarch. Despite a nomination from the Supreme Sangha Council, his official appointment as Supreme Patriarch was stalled due a refusal of the Thai secular government to forward his nomination to the King. In December 2016, the junta passed an amendment to the Sangha Act changing the rules for appointment of the Supreme Patriarch to bypass the Supreme Sangha Council and allow the King of Thailand to appoint the Supreme Patriarch directly, with the Thai Prime Minister countersigning. While proponents considered the amendment a good way for politicians to solve the problems the Sangha had not been able to solve, opponents described the amendment as "sneaky". Chao Khun Prasarn Candasaro, vice-rector of the Mahachulalongkornrajavidyalaya University and assistant-abbot of Wat Mahathat Yuwaratrangsarit, stated the amendment showed a grave lack of respect for the Sangha Council's authority, because the council had not been involved in the amendment at all. He argued that the Monastic Act had always given the final decision to the King anyway, and pointed out that all conflicts about the appointment were caused by the junta's National Reform Council, not by the Sangha itself. Finally, on 7 February 2017, Somdet Amborn Ambaro was appointed by King Rama X to serve as the next Supreme Patriarch out of five names given to him by Prime Minister Prayut Chan-o-Cha. The appointment ceremony was held on 12 February at Wat Phra Kaew, Grand Palace.

List of Supreme Patriarchs

See also 

Buddhism in Thailand
Mahanayaka
Sangharaja
Sangha Supreme Council
State Saṅgha Mahā Nāyaka Committee
Supreme Patriarch of Cambodia
Thathanabaing of Burma

References

External links 
English website of the Supreme Patriarch
A website with information about each Supreme Patriarch
Entry on the current Supreme Patriarch at Everything2
Buddhism in contemporary Thailand, information from Mahachulalongkornrajvidyalaya University
Buddhism in Thailand, information from Dhammathai.org
 A Review of Reform Movements in Thai Buddhism by Dr. Tavivat Puntarigvivat

Buddhism in Thailand